Matthew Reid may refer to:

Matthew Reid (politician) (1856–1947), Australian Senator and member of the Queensland Legislative Assembly
Matt Reid (tennis) (born 1990), Australian professional tour tennis player
Matt Reid (baseball) (born 1978), American college baseball coach
Quintin Jardine (born 1945), author, who uses the pen-name Matthew Reid
Matt Reid (rugby league), player for North Wales Crusaders

See also
Matthew Reed (disambiguation)
Matthew Read (disambiguation)
Matt Rhead (born 1984), English footballer